Víctor Ibáñez Pascual (born 21 April 1989) is a Spanish professional footballer who plays for Japanese club Matsumoto Yamaga FC as a goalkeeper.

Club career
Born in Barcelona, Catalonia, Ibáñez was a product of RCD Espanyol's youth system. He made his senior debut with the reserves in 2007, in Segunda División B. After two unsuccessful loan spells at CD Castellón and SD Eibar, he left the club in 2011 and signed for Lleida Esportiu; all of the sides competed in the same division.

Ibáñez joined FC Cartagena of the third tier on 4 July 2012. On 9 July 2013, after winning the Ricardo Zamora Trophy in Group IV, he moved to UD Almería B in the same league.

After being a regular starter, Ibáñez agreed to a two-year deal with Segunda División side AD Alcorcón on 3 July 2014. In September, however, after being deemed surplus to requirements by manager José Bordalás, he terminated his contract and signed for Deportivo Aragón the following month.

On 15 July 2015, Ibáñez joined CE L'Hospitalet on a one-year deal. He moved abroad for the first time on 10 January 2017, signing with J2 League club FC Gifu. He remained in Japan the following years, with SC Sagamihara, Montedio Yamagata and Matsumoto Yamaga FC.

Career statistics (Japan only)

References

External links
Gifu official profile 

1989 births
Living people
Spanish footballers
Footballers from Barcelona
Association football goalkeepers
Segunda División B players
Tercera División players
RCD Espanyol B footballers
CD Castellón footballers
SD Eibar footballers
Lleida Esportiu footballers
FC Cartagena footballers
UD Almería B players
AD Alcorcón footballers
Real Zaragoza B players
CE L'Hospitalet players
J2 League players
J3 League players
FC Gifu players
SC Sagamihara players
Montedio Yamagata players
Matsumoto Yamaga FC players
Spanish expatriate footballers
Expatriate footballers in Japan
Spanish expatriate sportspeople in Japan